The XNOR gate (sometimes ENOR, EXNOR or NXOR and pronounced as Exclusive NOR. Alternatively XAND, pronounced Exclusive AND) is a digital logic gate whose function is the logical complement of the Exclusive OR (XOR) gate. It is equivalent to the logical connective from mathematical logic, also known as the material biconditional. The two-input version implements logical equality, behaving according to the truth table to the right, and hence the gate is sometimes called an "equivalence gate". A high output (1) results if both of the inputs to the gate are the same. If one but not both inputs are high (1), a low output (0) results.

The algebraic expressions  and  both represent the XNOR gate with inputs A and B.

Symbols
There are two symbols for XNOR gates: one with distinctive shape and one with rectangular shape and label.  Both symbols for the XNOR gate are that of the XOR gate with an added inversion bubble.

Hardware description
XNOR gates are represented in most TTL and CMOS IC families. The standard 4000 series CMOS IC is the 4077, and the TTL IC is the 74266 (although an open-collector implementation). Both include four independent, two-input, XNOR gates. The (now obsolete) 74S135 implemented four two-input XOR/XNOR gates or two three-input XNOR gates. 

Both the TTL 74LS implementation, the 74LS266, as well as the CMOS gates (CD4077, 74HC4077 and 74HC266 and so on) are available from most semiconductor manufacturers such as Texas Instruments or NXP, etc. They are usually available in both through-hole DIP and SOIC formats (SOIC-14, SOC-14 or TSSOP-14). 

Datasheets are readily available in most datasheet databases and suppliers.

Pinout
Both the 4077 and 74x266 devices (SN74LS266, 74HC266, 74266, etc.) have the same pinout diagram, as follows:

Pinout diagram of the 74HC266N, 74LS266 and CD4077 quad XNOR plastic dual in-line package 14-pin package (PDIP-14) ICs.

Alternatives

If a specific type of gate is not available, a circuit that implements the same function can be constructed from other available gates. A circuit implementing an XNOR function can be trivially constructed from an XOR gate followed by a NOT gate. If we consider the expression , we can construct an XNOR gate circuit directly using AND, OR and NOT gates. However, this approach requires five gates of three different kinds.

As alternative, if different gates are available we can apply Boolean algebra to transform  as stated above, and apply de Morgan's Law to the last term to get  which can be implemented using only three gates as shown on the right.

An XNOR gate circuit can be made from four NOR gates. In fact, both NAND and NOR gates are so-called "universal gates" and any logical function can be constructed from either NAND logic or NOR logic alone. If the four NOR gates are replaced by NAND gates, this results in an XOR gate, which can be converted to an XNOR gate by inverting the output or one of the inputs (e.g. with a fifth NAND gate). 

For the NAND constructions, the lower arrangement offers the advantage of a shorter propagation delay (the time delay between an input changing and the output changing). For the NOR constructions, the upper arrangement requires fewer gates.

From the opposite perspective, constructing other gates using only XNOR gates is possible though XNOR is not a fully universal logic gate.  NOT and XOR gates can be constructed this way.

More than two inputs
Although other gates (OR, NOR, AND, NAND) are available from manufacturers with three or more inputs per gate, this is not strictly true with XOR and XNOR gates. However, extending the concept of the binary logical operation to three inputs, the SN74S135 with two shared "C" and four independent "A" and "B" inputs for its four outputs, was a device that followed the truth table:

This is effectively Y = NOT ((A XOR B) XOR C). Another way to interpret this is that the output is true if an even number of inputs are true. It does not implement a logical "equivalence" function, unlike two-input XNOR gates.

Additionally, the XOR function seems to act as a parity function or Mod2 for the sum of all inputs. Note how *y* is equal to 1 if the sum of all inputs is even, which implies that y = 0 if the sum of all inputs is odd. We may conclude from this that x XOR y XOR z = is even (x+y+z).

See also

AND gate
OR gate
NOT gate
NAND gate
NOR gate
XOR gate
Kronecker delta function
Logical biconditional
If and only if

References

External links 
Texas Instruments© CD4077 Datasheet

Logic gates

it:Algebra di Boole#XNOR